James E. Ryan (February 21, 1946 – June 12, 2022) was an American lawyer and politician who served two four-year terms as Illinois Attorney General. A career Republican, he received his party's nomination and ran unsuccessfully for Governor of Illinois against Rod Blagojevich in 2002.

Education
Ryan was born in Chicago on February 21, 1946 and grew up in the suburb of Villa Park, Illinois. His father, Edward Ryan, was a construction worker while his mother was an Italian immigrant housewife. As a youth, he was active in boxing and won the middleweight title in the 1963 Chicago Golden Gloves tournament when he was 17 years old. He attended a Benedictine-run high school, Saint Procopius Academy (now Benet Academy). Upon graduating, Ryan went on to study at Saint Procopius College (now Benedictine University), where he obtained his Bachelor of Arts degree in political science in 1968. He then went on to Chicago-Kent College of Law where he obtained his J.D. in 1971.

Career in politics
Ryan entered the legal profession having found a position with the DuPage County State's Attorney office. After three years, he was promoted to first Assistant State's Attorney. In 1976, Ryan left the public sector to enter private practice. He worked at an independent law firm until 1984.

DuPage County State's Attorney
Ryan sought the Republican nomination for state's attorney in 1976 but was defeated by J. Michael Fitzsimons. After eight years in private practice, Ryan ran against Fitzsimmons again in the 1984 election, and defeated him in the Republican primary. He won the general election and was re-elected in 1988 and 1992. During his time as state's attorney, he served as president of the Illinois State's Attorney's Association.

Illinois Attorney General
Ryan first ran for Illinois Attorney General in 1990, but was defeated by the Democrat, Roland Burris. He ran again four years later and won. He was reelected in 1998 with the endorsement of every major newspaper in the state. Ryan's most notable accomplishment as Illinois Attorney General was his $9.1 billion settlement from tobacco companies. He was the last Republican to serve as Illinois attorney general.

2002 gubernatorial campaign

In 2002, Ryan was the Republican candidate for governor of Illinois, defeating two other candidates for the Republican nomination. However, as an incumbent member of the state government, his campaign was negatively affected by scandals engulfing the administration of outgoing Governor George Ryan (no relation). There was concern that the two men's similar names would also lead to confusion and further association between the two, so, according to the Chicago Tribune, Jim Ryan's campaign sent "a missive to newspaper editors urging them to use 'initials or full names in headlines and graphics' to make clear to readers whether they were referring to George Ryan or the attorney general". In the end, he lost the general election, winning 45% of the vote against Democratic U.S. Representative Rod Blagojevich, who won 52% of the vote.

2010 gubernatorial campaign

Ryan again ran for governor in 2010 and at one point led in aggregate polling, but he eventually lost the Republican primary to State Senator Bill Brady, coming in fourth in a field of seven candidates.
He was on the receiving end of a great deal of controversy for his conduct in the erroneous prosecution of Rolando Cruz and Alex Hernandez in the Jeanine Nicarico murder case.

Electoral history
Illinois gubernatorial election, 2002
Rod Blagojevich (D), 52%
Jim Ryan (R), 45%
Illinois Attorney General, 1998
Jim Ryan (R) (inc.), 61%
Miriam Santos (D), 37%
Illinois Attorney General, 1994
Jim Ryan (R), 54%
Al Hofeld (D), 45%
Illinois Attorney General, 1990
Roland Burris (D), 52%
Jim Ryan (R), 48%

Career in academia
After the 2002 elections, Ryan returned to his alma mater, Benedictine University, where he was named a Distinguished Fellow and taught political science and criminal justice courses. In 2005, he established the Center for Civic Leadership at Benedictine.

Personal life
Ryan and his wife, Marie, had six children.

In 1996, Jim Ryan was diagnosed with Stage 2 non-Hodgkin lymphoma and began chemotherapy. In January 1997, the youngest of Jim and Marie Ryan's six children, 12-year-old Anne Marie, collapsed and died of a brain tumor. In October 1997, Marie Ryan suffered what appeared to be a near-fatal heart attack as the couple walked near their home; the cause turned out to be a rare virus.

On October 8, 2007, Ryan's son, Patrick, died from a self-inflicted gunshot wound at the family's home in Elmhurst, aged 24.

Death 
Ryan died at his home in DuPage County on June 12, 2022, aged 76, after what a family spokesperson described as "several lengthy illnesses".

References

External links
 Jim Ryan, Distinguished Fellow at Benedictine University – faculty search page at Benedictine University
 Jim Ryan, Attorney at Law, Naperville Illinois 

|-

1946 births
2022 deaths
20th-century American lawyers
20th-century American politicians
21st-century American politicians
American people of Italian descent
American legal scholars
Benedictine University alumni
Benedictine University faculty
Candidates in the 1976 United States elections
Candidates in the 2002 United States elections
Candidates in the 2010 United States elections
Chicago-Kent College of Law alumni
Illinois Attorneys General
Illinois Institute of Technology alumni
Illinois Republicans
Lawyers from Chicago
People from Elmhurst, Illinois
People from Villa Park, Illinois
Politicians from Chicago